Thomas Richard Bunday (September 28, 1948 – March 15, 1983) was an American serial killer who, from 1979 to 1981, committed a series of murders of young women and girls in the city of Fairbanks, Alaska. At the time of the killings, Bunday was serving at the Eielson Air Force Base near Fairbanks, and for a long time avoided suspicion. Despite confessing to the crimes, Bunday was not immediately arrested due to a legal mistake and remained at liberty for another eight days, during which, for unknown reasons, he did not make any effort to evade justice.

Early years
Thomas Bunday was born on September 28, 1948, in Nashville, Tennessee. He was the younger of two children in the family, his elder brother Ralph being 15 years older than him. Bunday spent his childhood and youth in a socially unfavorable situation: his father, a World War II veteran, suffered from mental disorders and was aggressive towards his wife and younger son. After his father died in 1963, Thomas refused to attend his funeral and ran away from home for several days.

Bunday was unpopular among the other children at school, but he was a good student, a sociable child who had many friends and acquaintances, which helped develop his positive outlook on life. After graduating from high school in 1966, he married his high school sweetheart and in 1967 joined the United States Air Force, where he achieved the rank of technical sergeant. In the late 1960s and early 1970s, Bunday was serving in Southeast Asia. During this period, his wife gave birth to a son fathered by another man.

Despite this, he continued to live with his wife, who later gave birth to a daughter, but an extramarital child strained their relationship. In the mid-1970s, Bunday was sent to further service at Eielson Base, Alaska. During this period, he began to show signs of emotional burnout and began visiting a psychotherapist.

Murders
The murder series began on August 29, 1979, when Fairbanks resident Glinda Sodemann, 19, went missing. Her decomposed body was found two months later in a gravel pit near the highway, 23 miles south of Fairbanks. On June 13, 1980, 11-year-old Doris Oehring went missing. The brother of the deceased told police that a few days before his sister disappeared, he saw her talking to a stranger sitting in a blue car and wearing an Air Force uniform. The brother then helped the investigator make a complete identikit of the criminal. 

On January 31, 1981, 20-year-old Marlene Peters went missing, who on the day of her disappearance gathered to hitchhike from Fairbanks to Anchorage. Five weeks later, Wendy Wilson, 16, disappeared on her way to the Olp's to see her boyfriend who was staying there. Mrs. Olp had offered Wendy a ride before she had disappeared. On May 16, 1981, 18-year-old Lori King disappeared, and shortly before her disappearance, Marlene Peters' partially decomposed body was found. In October 1981, not far from Wilson's body, the decomposed body of King was found near the Eielson Air Base. During the investigation, the police for the first time suggested that a serial killer from among the military personnel was operating in the territory.

Discovery
During the investigation, the police inspected all personnel of the Eielson Air Base, including the employees employed as civilian specialists. By February 3, 1982, only three people were included in the suspect list, who at various times were distinguished by their destructive behavior towards women, one of them being Bunday. By that time, he had been transferred to Wichita Falls, Texas, where he had served since September 1981. 

Thomas Bunday was arrested on March 7, 1983, and was taken to the police station to be interrogated. In addition to an interrogation, a search was conducted in his house and the trunk of his car. During the search, evidence was found linking Bunday with the murders in Fairbanks. Upon learning of this, Thomas on the same day admitted to killing five women and girls and described in detail the murders and the circumstances in which they occurred. 

He was also questioned about the murder of Cassandra Goodwin on March 22, but vehemently refused to admit to her murder. Bunday indicated psychological problems and sexual complexes as a motive for committing the murders. Despite his confession, he was not arrested and had to be released because there was no warrant for his arrest.

Death
Alaskan authorities issued an arrest warrant for Thomas Bunday on March 15, 1983, but he was not immediately arrested in Texas. Riding his motorcycle about  40 miles outside Wichita Falls, Texas, Bunday rode into the oncoming lane of the highway and collided with a truck. He died almost instantly. The incident was subsequently recognized as a suicide.

See also
List of serial killers in the United States

References

1983 suicides
1948 births
American serial killers
Male serial killers
Motorcycle road incident deaths
Pages with unreviewed translations
People from Nashville, Tennessee
Road incident deaths in Texas
Suicides in Texas
United States Air Force non-commissioned officers